Hydnocarpus octandrus is a species of plant in the Achariaceae family, but originally placed in the Flacourtiaceae family by Arthur Cronquist. It is endemic to Sri Lanka.

In culture
Known as "wal divul" in Sinhala

References

octandra
Vulnerable plants
Endemic flora of Sri Lanka
Taxonomy articles created by Polbot
Taxobox binomials not recognized by IUCN